The Hâncu Monastery is a monastery in Bursuc, Moldova. The monastery was founded in 1678, in the Principality of Moldavia.

The monastery was built by Mihail Hancu, Great High Steward, when his daughter expressed a desire to become a nun. It was a female community and lasted until the mid-eighteenth century and the Tatar invasion. Following the arrival of the Russian army under Rumeantev (1770-1772) the monastery was restored by monks and became a male community.

Two new stone churches were built (replacing an earlier wooden church); the first in 1835 was dedicated to St Pious Parascheva; the second in 1845 was dedicated to the Dormition of the Mother of God.

Under Communism the monastery site was nationalised in 1944 and the religious community disbanded in 1965. In 1978 the buildings were converted for use as a sanatorium, with the oldest church transformed into a social club. Following the collapse of the Soviet Union, the monastery was reopened in 1990, with monks resident for two years. In 1992 it was returned to its original purpose as a monastery for women, and today houses a large community of nuns.

The monastery site today includes a retreat house and the official residence of the local bishop.

Gallery

References

External links

 Mănăstirea "Sfânta Cuvioasa Parascheva" Hâncu  at ortodoxia.md
 Manastirea Hancu at crestinortodox.ro
 About Hâncu Monastery at travelmoldova.eu
 Panoramas of Hâncu monastery
 HDR Photos of Hâncu monastery

Christian monasteries in Moldova
Religious organizations established in 1678
Christian monasteries established in the 17th century
Churches in Moldova
Religious buildings and structures in Moldova
1678 establishments in Europe